Captain 2nd rank is a rank used by the Russian Navy and a number of former communist states. The rank is the middle rank in the staff officer's career group. The rank is equivalent to Lieutenant colonel in armies and air forces. Within NATO forces, the rank is rated as OF-4 and is equivalent to Commander in English speaking navies.

Russia

Russian Empire 
The rank was introduced in Russia by Peter the Great in 1722. From the introduction of the Russian table of ranks to the abolishment in 1917 Captain 2nd rank was quoted to rank positioned VII, and until 1856 it was privileged by hereditary nobility. In the Russian Empire Navy it was the second highest rank of the stab-ofizer (derived from German Stabsoffizier) career group.

Soviet Navy and Russian Federation
The first equivalent rank in the Soviet Navy (from 1918 to 1935) was Starpom of the ship 1st rank,. 

This particular rank was introduced by disposal of the Central Executive Committee of the Soviet Union and the Council of People's Commissars, from September 22, 1935. The Red Army reintroduced the Captain 2nd rank rank in 1935, together with a number of other former Russian ranks, and it has been used in many ex-USSR countries, including Russia, to the present day.

Pertaining to Engineer aboard of war ships the equivalent rank designation in the Soviet Navy was  Captain 2nd rank-engineer. Any other naval personnel on-shore assignments (e.g. medical service, chemical defence, marines, and naval aviation) have been entitled Podpolkovnik.

In the navy of the Russian Federation there are three ranks in the staff officer´s (until 1917: stab-ofizer, derived from German Stabsoffizier) career group, which means:

 Captain 1st rank
 Captain 2nd rank
 Captain 3rd rank

 Types of rank insignia Captain 2nd rank

Captain 2nd rank insignia

See also 
 History of Russian military ranks
 Ranks and rank insignia of the Russian armed forces until 1917
 Ranks and rank insignia of the Red Army 1918–1935, ... 1935–1940 and ... 1940–1943
 Ranks and rank insignia of the Soviet Army 1943–1955 and Ranks and rank insignia of the Soviet Army 1955–1991,
Ranks and rank insignia of the Russian Federation´s armed forces 1994–2010
 Naval ranks and insignia of the Russian Federation

References

Military ranks
Military ranks of Russia
Military ranks of the Soviet Union
Military ranks of Ukraine